The Waycross Micropolitan Statistical Area (μSA), as defined by the United States Census Bureau, is an area consisting of two counties in Georgia, anchored by the city of Waycross.

As of the 2000 census, the μSA had a population of 51,119 (though a July 1, 2009 estimate placed the population at 54,494).

Counties
Pierce
Ware

Communities
Incorporated places
Blackshear
Offerman
Patterson
Waycross (Principal city)
Census-designated places (Note: All census-designated places are unincorporated)
Deenwood
Sunnyside
Unincorporated places
Bristol
Dixie Union
Hacklebarney
Manor
Mershon
Millwood
Otter Creek
Ruskin
Sandy Bottom
Walkerville
Waresboro

Demographics
As of the census of 2000, there were 51,119 people, 19,433 households, and 13,735 families residing within the μSA. The racial makeup of the μSA was 74.93% White, 22.78% African American, 0.20% Native American, 0.39% Asian, 0.04% Pacific Islander, 0.98% from other races, and 0.68% from two or more races. Hispanic or Latino of any race were 2.04% of the population.

The median income for a household in the μSA was $29,128, and the median income for a family was $35,138. Males had a median income of $27,621 versus $20,098 for females. The per capita income for the μSA was $14,307.

See also
Georgia census statistical areas

References

 
Geography of Ware County, Georgia
Geography of Pierce County, Georgia